The Week is a weekly news magazine with editions in the United Kingdom and United States. The British publication was founded in 1995 and the American edition in 2001. An Australian edition was published from 2008 to 2012. A children's edition, The Week Junior, has been published in the UK since 2015, and the US since 2020.

History 
The Week was founded in the United Kingdom by Jolyon Connell (formerly of the Sunday Telegraph) in 1995. In April 2001, the magazine began publishing an American edition; and an Australian edition followed in October 2008. Dennis Publishing, founded by Felix Dennis, publishes the UK edition and, until 2012, published the Australian edition. The Week Publications publishes the U.S. edition.
In the year 2021, The Week celebrated its 20 year anniversary of its first publication in the United States.

Since November 2015 The Week has published a children's edition, The Week Junior, a current affairs magazine aimed at 8 to 14 year olds.

The Australian edition of The Week ceased operation in October 2012. The final edition, its 199th, was released on 12 October 2012. At the end, it was selling 28,000 copies a week, with a readership of 83,000.

Future Plc acquired Dennis Publishing and several of its titles including The Week in 2021.

Content
The magazine's content largely consists of summaries of news stories and opinion columns published by other media outlets earlier in the week, and presents a broad spectrum of political viewpoints. Some summaries are based on articles in foreign media that were originally published in a language other than English.

Website
In September 2007, the magazine's U.S. edition launched a daily website. A UK site followed soon after. Both websites reflect the approach of the magazines, publishing non-partisan articles that encompass a wide range of perspectives. The Week launched a podcast, The Week Unwrapped in 2017, which was named news podcast of the year at the Publisher Podcast Awards in 2020 and 2021.

References

Further reading
 Jeremy W. Peters, "The News, in Bright Bits," The New York Times, March 13, 2011

External links
 Official website (U.S. edition)
 Official website (U.K. edition)

News magazines published in the United States
News magazines published in Australia
News magazines published in the United Kingdom
Defunct magazines published in Australia
English-language magazines
Magazines established in 1995
Magazines established in 2001
Magazines established in 2008
Magazines disestablished in 2012